Salm is the name of several historic countships and principalities in present Germany, Belgium, Luxembourg and France.

History

Origins
The County of Salm arose in the tenth century in Vielsalm, in the Ardennes region of present Belgium. It was ruled by a junior branch of the House of Luxembourg, called the House of Salm.

In 1165, it was divided into the counties of Lower Salm, in the Ardennes, situated in Belgium and Luxembourg, and the county of Upper Salm, situated in the Vosges mountains, present France.

Lower Salm

The counts of Lower Salm became extinct in 1416, and the county was inherited by the House of Reifferscheid-Dyck. In 1628 the county was elevated to an altgraviate, and henceforth the fief was renamed the Altgraviate of Salm-Reifferscheid.

In 1639 the Altgraviate was divided up into the Altgraviate of Salm-Reifferscheid-Bedburg, to the Northwest of Cologne, and the Altgraviate of Salm-Reifferscheid-Dyck, Neuss.

Salm-Reifferscheid-Bedburg

In 1734 the Altgraviate of Salm-Reifferscheid-Bedburg was divided in three by splitting off the Altgraviate of Salm-Reifferscheid-Raitz, from Bohemian descent, and the Altgraviate of Salm-Reifferscheid-Hainsbach from the original altgraviate.

In 1803 the, smaller, Altgraviate of Salm-Reifferscheid-Bedburg was renamed the Altgraviate of Salm-Reifferscheid-Krautheim. In 1804 it was raised to a principality, und existed until 1806, when it was mediatised.

Salm-Reifferscheid-Dyck
The county was mediatised, and the family branch became extinct in 1888.

Upper Salm

In 1246 the County of Upper Salm was split up, and the County of Salm-Blankenburg came into existence, next to it.

In 1431 the County of Upper Salm was split up again, and the County of Salm-Badenweiler came into existence, next to it.

The County of Upper Salm was inherited by the Wild- and Rhinegraves in 1475, who then called their fief the Wild- and Rhinegraviate of Upper Salm.

In 1499 the Wild- and Rhinegraviate of Salm was divided up into two entities, the Wild- and Rhinegraviate of Salm-Kyrburg and the Wild- and Rhinegraviate of Salm-Dhaun.

Salm-Blankenburg
The county became extinct in 1506, and was inherited by the House of Lorraine.

Salm-Badenweiler

In 1520 the County of Salm-Badenweiler was split up, and the County of Salm-Neuburg came into existence, next to it. In 1653 the fief was inherited by the Austrian House of Sinzendorf, but the House of Salm kept using the title until 1784, when the last lord died.

The county was annexed by the House of Lorraine from 1600 until 1608, when it came back into the family. 1670 the territory was finally annexed by France.

Salm-Kyrburg

In 1607 the Wild- and Rhinegraviate of Salm-Kyrburg was divided in three by splitting off the Wild- and Rhinagraviate of Salm-Mörchingen and the Wild- and Rhinagraviate of Salm-Tronecken from the original Wild- and Rhinegraviate. In 1637 the lord of Salm-Tronecken died and his territories were joined with ... . In 1681 the last lord of Salm-Kyrburg died, and his territories were joined with Salm-Mörchingen.

In 1688 the last lord of Salm-Mörchingen died. His territories were joined with ... .

In 1743 a completely new territory of Salm-Kyrburg was created, this time the Principality of Salm-Kyrburg. It was shortly annexed by France in 1811 and mediatised in 1813. But the family kept using the titles.

Salm-Dhaun

In 1561 the Wild- and Rhinegraviate of Salm-Neuweiler and the Wild- and Rhinegraviate of Salm-Grumbach were split off Salm-Dhaun.

In 1697 the Wild- and Rhinegraviate of Salm-Püttlingen was split off Salm-Dhaun.

In 1748 the Salm-Dhaun branch of the family became extinct, its territories went to the branch of Salm-Püttlingen.

Salm-Püttlingen
Salm-Püttlingen became extinct in 1750. Their territories went to ... .

Salm-Neuweiler

In 1610 the Wild- and Rhinegraviate of Salm was split off Salm-Neuweiler. It was elevated to the Principality of Salm in 1623.

In 1803, when the Bishopric of Münster was secularized, part of it was given to the princes of Salm-Salm who by then already were in possession of the Lordship of Anholt. This new Principality of Salm, covering the area around Borken, Ahaus and Bocholt, was a member of the Confederation of the Rhine. In 1810 it was annexed by France, as a part of the Imperial département of Lippe. After the defeat of Napoleon in 1815, it was mediatized to Prussia. The family branch exist until today.

In 1696 Salm-Neuweiler was divided in two, the Wild- and Rhinegraviate of Salm-Leuze and the Wild- and Rhinegraviate of Salm-Hoogstraten. Their lands were incorporated into Belgium. The branches became extinct in 1887 and 1186.

Salm-Grumbach

In 1668 the Wild- and Rhinegraviate of Rheingrafenstein-Grenzweiler was split off Salm-Grumbach. It was mediatised and incorporated into Prussia. The branch extinction occurred in 1819.

In 1803 Salm-Grumbach was annexed by France. The lords of Salm-Grumbach received the Principality of Salm-Horstmar as compensation in 1803. It was mediatised in 1813. The family branch sold its titles to Salm-Salm in 1892.

List of states
 1019–1165 : County of Salm (Lower and Upper Salm)
 1165–1416 : County of Lower Salm / 1416–1628 : County of Salm-Reifferscheid / 1628-1639 Altgraviate of Salm-Reifferscheid
 1639–1803 : Altgraviate of Salm-Reifferscheid-Bedburg
 1803–1804 : Altgraviate of Salm-Reifferscheid-Krautheim
 1804–1806 : Principality of Salm-Reifferscheid-Krautheim (mediatised to Prussia, branch became extinct in 1893)
 1734–1790 : County of Salm-Reifferscheid-Raitz
 1790–1811 : Principality of Salm-Reifferscheid-Raitz (mediatised to Austria, branch still extant)
 1734–1811 : County of Salm-Reifferscheid-Hainsbach (mediatised to Prussia, branch became extinct in 1897)
 1639–1806 : Altgraviate of Salm-Reifferscheid-Dyck (mediatised to Prussia, branch became extinct in 1888)
 1165–1475 : County of Upper Salm / 1475-1499 : Wild- and Rhinegraviate of Upper Salm (House of Salm-Dhaun and House of Salm-Kyrburg)
 1210–1500 : County of Salm-Blankenburg (House of Lorraine)
 1431–1670 : County of Salm-Badenweiler (House of Bourbon)
 1520–1784 : County of Salm-Neuburg (House of Sinzendorf)
 1499–1748 : Wild- and Rhinegraviate of Salm-Dhaun (House of Salm-Püttlingen)
 1697–1750 : Wild- and Rhinegraviate of Salm-Püttlingen (?)
 1561–1696 : Wild- and Rhinegraviate of Salm-Neuweiler (House of Salm-Leuze and House of Salm-Hoogstraten)
 1574-1738 : Wild- and Rhinegraviate of Salm-Salm
 1738–1810 : Principality of Salm-Salm (mediatised to Prussia)
 1696–1742 : Wild- and Rhinegraviate of Salm-Leuze
 1742–1743 : Principality of Salm-Leuze (House of Salm-Kyrburg)
 1696–1738 : Wild- and Rhinegraviate of Salm-Hoogstraten (later known as House of Salm-Salm)
 1561–1803 : Wild- and Rhinegraviate of Salm-Grumbach (mediatised to Prussia)
 1803–1813 : Principality of Salm-Horstmar (mediatised to Prussia, branch still extant)
 1668-????' Wild- and Rhinegraviate of Rheingrafenstein-Grenzweiler (branch became extinct in 1819)
 1499–1681 : Wild- and Rhinegraviate of Salm-Kyrburg (House of Salm-Mörchingen)
 1607-1637 : Wild and Rhinegraviate of Salm-Tronecken (branch became extinct in 1637)
 1607–1688 : Wild- and Rhinegraviate Salm-Mörchingen (branch became extinct in 1688)
 1743–1810 : Principality of Salm-Kyrburg (mediatised to Prussia)

List of rulers

Counts of Salm (1019–1165)

House of Salm
 Giselbert (1019–1059)
 Herman I (1059–1088)
 Andrea II (1088–1138)
 Herman (1138–1140)
 Henry (1140–1165)

Counts and Altgraves of Lower Salm (1165-1628-1639)

House of Salm
 Frederick I (1163–1172)
 Frederick II (1172–1210)
 Gerhard (1210–1240)
 Henry III (1240–1247)
 Henry IV (1247–1265)
 William (1265–1297)
 Henry V (1297–1336)
 Henry VI (1336–1362)
 John (1362–1370)
  (1370–1416)

House of Reifferscheid-Dyck
 Otto (1416–1455)
 John I (1455–1475)
 John II (1475–1479)
 Peter (1479–1505)
 John III (1505–1537)
 John IV (1537–1559)
 Werner (1559–1629)
 Ernst Frederick, (1629–1639) first altgrave

Altgraves of Salm-Reifferscheid-Bedbur and Princes of Salm-Reifferscheid-Krautheim (1639-1803-1893)

House of Reifferscheid-Dyck
 Erik Adolf (1639–1673)
 Francis William (1673–1734)
 Charles Anthony (1734–1755)
 Sigismund (1755–1798)
 Francis William, reign (1798–1806) last altgrave (1803–1804), first prince (1804–1806) died 1831
 Constantin (1831–1856), title in pretence
 Francis Charles (1856–1860)
 Leopold (1860–1893)
 Alfred (1893–1924)

Altgraves of Salm-Reifferscheid-Hainspach (1734-1811-1897)

House of Reifferscheid-Dyck
 Leopold Anthony (1734–1769)
 Francis Wenceslaus (1769–1832), title in pretence since 1811
 Francis Vincent (1832–1842)
 John (1842–1847)
 Francis Joseph (1847–1887)
 Alois (1887–1897)

Altgraves and Princes of Salm-Reifferscheid-Raitz (1734-1790-1918)

House of Reifferscheid-Dyck
 Anthony (1734–1769)
 Charles Joseph, last altgrave (1769–1790), first prince (1790–1811)
 Hugh I Francis (1811–1836), title in pretence
 Hugh II Charles (1836–1888)
 Hugh III (1888–1890)
 Hugh IV (1890–1903)
 Hugh V Leopold (1903–1946)
Hugh VI
 Hugh VII (born 1973)

Altgraves of Salm-Reifferscheid-Dyck (1639-1806-1888)

House of Reifferscheid-Dyck
 Ernest Salentin (1639–1684)
 Francis Ernest (1684–1721)
 August Eugene Bernard (1721–1767)
 William (1767–1775)
 Joseph Zu (1775–1806) in pretence until 1861
 Alfred (1861–1888), title to branch of Salm-Reifferscheid-Krautheim

Counts and Wild- and Rhinegraves of Upper Salm (1210-1475-1499)
 Henry I (1165–1210)
 Henry II (1210–1240)
 Henry III (1240–1293)
 John I (1293–1326)
 Nicolas (1326–1343)
 John II (1343–1351)
 Simon I (1351–1360)
 John III (1360–1386)
 Simon II (1386–1397)
 John IV (1397–1431)
 Simon III (1431–1475)
 John V, (1475–1495) first wild- and Rhinegrave
 John VI (1495–1499)

Counts of Salm-Blankenburg (1210-1506)
 Frederick I (1210–1270)
 Henry I (1270–1301)
 Henry II (1301–1361)
 Theobald I (1361–1363)
 Henry III (1363–1382)
 Theobald II (1382–1396)
 Henry IV (1396–1441)
 Frederick II (1441–1442)
 Theobald III (1442–1443)
 Louis (1443–1503)
 Ulrick (1503–1506)

Counts of Salm-Badenweiler (1431-1600)
 John V (1431–1451)
 John VI (1451–1505)
 John VII (1505–1548)
 John VIII (1548–1600)

Wild- and Rhinegraves of Salm-Dhaun (1499-1748)
 Philip (1499–1521)
 Philip Francis (1521–1561)
 John Philip I (1561–1569)
 Frederick (1569–1574)
 Adolf Henry (1574–1606)
 Wolfgang Frederick (1606–1638)
 John Louis (1638–1673)
 John Philip II (1673–1693)
 Charles (1693–1733)
 John Philip III (1733–1742)
 Christian Otto (1742–1748)

Wild- and Rhinegraves of Salm-Neuweiler (1561-1696)
 Frederick I (1561–1610)
 Frederick II (1610–1673)
 Charles Florentin (1673–1676)
 Frederick Charles (1676–1696)

Wild- and Rhinegraves of Salm-Leuze and Princes of Salm-Kyburg (1696-1743-1813-1905)
 Henry Gabriel (1696–1716)
 Philipp Joseph of Salm-Leuze, last wild- and Rhinegrave (1716–1743), first sovereign prince (1743–1779)
 Frederick III (1779–1794)
 Frederick IV, last sovereign prince (1794–1813), first mediatised prince (1813–1859)
 Frederick V (1859–1887)
 Frederick VI Louis (1887–1905)

Wild- and Rhinegraves and Princes of Salm-Hoogstraten (1696-1739-1886)
 William Florentin (1696–1707)
 Nicolas Leopold I, (1707–1770) first prince
see Princes of Salm-Salm

Wild- and Rhinegraves and Princes of Salm-Salm (1574-1738-1813-present)

 Frederick I, first and last Wild- and Rhinegrave (1574–1608)
 Philip Otto, last count (????-????), first prince (1608–1634)
 Leopold Philip (1634–1663)
 Charles Theodor Otto (1663–1710)
 Louis Otto, last prince (1710–1738)
 Nicholas Leopold I, first sovereign prince (1739–1770)
 Louis Otto Charles (1770–1771)
 Maximilian (1771–1773)
 Louis Otto Charles (1773–1778)
 Constantine Alexander, last sovereign prince (1778–1813)
 Constantin Alexander, first mediatised prince (1813–1828)
 Florentin (1828–1846)
 Alfred I (1846–1886)
 Nicolas Leopold II (1886–1908)
 Alfred II (1908–1923)
 Nicolas Leopold III (1923–1988)
 Charles-Philip (1988–present)
 Emanuel, heir (born 1961)

Wild- and Rhinegraves of Salm-Püttlingen (1697-1750)
 Vollrath Victor (1697–1730)
 John (1730–1750)
 Frederick
 Frederick William (????-1748)
 John Frederick (1748–1750)
 Charles Leopold Louis (1750-1750)
 Frederick William (1750-1750)

References and external links

 House of Salm , at europeanheraldry.org
  History of the Principality of Salm , at the Office de Tourisme Pays des Abbayes
  Salm Castle
 Information and symbols of the Principality of Salm
 Flags of the Principality of Salm-Salm

States and territories disestablished in 1815
States and territories established in 1019
1
History of Alsace
States of the Holy Roman Empire
Medieval Belgium